William Atherton Knight (born July 30, 1947) is an American actor, best known for portraying Richard Thornburg in Die Hard and its sequel and Walter Peck in Ghostbusters.

Early life 
Atherton was born in Orange, Connecticut, the son of Myrtle (née Robinson) and Robert Atherton Knight. He studied acting at the Drama School at Carnegie Tech and graduated from Carnegie Mellon University in 1969.

Career
Atherton was successful on the New York stage immediately after graduating and worked with many of the country's leading playwrights including David Rabe, John Guare, and Arthur Miller, winning numerous awards for his work on and off Broadway.

He got his big break playing hapless fugitive Clovis Poplin in The Sugarland Express (1974), the feature film debut of Steven Spielberg. After this, he garnered major roles in dark dramas such as The Day of the Locust (1975) and Looking for Mr. Goodbar (1977), as well as the big-budget disaster film The Hindenburg (1975). Atherton also starred as cowboy Jim Lloyd in the miniseries Centennial (1978), based on the novel by James Michener. He appeared in the comedy Ghostbusters (1984) as the officious condescending EPA agent Walter Peck. K. Thor Jensen wrote, "Atherton, who plays cowardly EPA lawyer Walter Peck, is the real villain of the movie (his releasing the ghosts from the containment unit added to the chaos in New York), [he] was so hated that after the movie came out he was harassed on the street and challenged to fights in bars."

Martha Coolidge chose Atherton to play Professor Jerry Hathaway in the teen comedy Real Genius (1985). Atherton played reporter Richard "Dick" Thornburg in the blockbuster action film Die Hard (1988), and reprised the role in its sequel Die Hard 2 (1990).

Other film credits include No Mercy (1986), The Pelican Brief (1993), Bio-Dome (1996), Mad City (1997), The Crow: Salvation (2000), The Last Samurai (2003), Grim Prairie Tales (1990), the TV movies Buried Alive (1990), Headspace (2005) and Virus (1995). He has also made guest appearances on such television series as The Twilight Zone, Murder, She Wrote, Desperate Housewives, Law & Order, The Equalizer, Boston Legal, Castle and Monk. Atherton provided the voice of Dr. Destiny on Justice League. He had a recurring role in NBC's detective drama Life.

While starring in The Day of the Locust, Atherton was offered and accepted the opportunity to provide lead vocals for "What'll I Do", the main title theme for the Robert Redford film version of The Great Gatsby. His 2007 appearances included the film The Girl Next Door, an adaptation of the best-selling Jack Ketchum novel of the same name. He also reprised his role as Walter Peck in Ghostbusters: The Video Game, released on June 16, 2009.

Atherton was cast in the final season of ABC's Lost. He appeared in the musical Gigi for the Reprise Theatre in Los Angeles as "Honoré Lachailles" in 2011.

Following his work on the musical, he stepped into a comedic role in Tim and Eric's Billion Dollar Movie (2012), produced by Will Ferrell's Funny or Die, Gary Sanchez Productions and Abso Lutely Productions.

In summer 2014, Atherton was cast in a recurring role as Viceroy Mercado in the Syfy series Defiance'''s second season.

Atherton co-starred in the 2017 Netflix thriller, Clinical, and appears in several upcoming documentaries on his most iconic films. The first to be released is the 2019 Cleanin' Up the Town: Remembering Ghostbusters which features the original 1984 cast.

Personal life
Atherton has been married to writer Bobbi Goldin since December 8, 1980. On the Phil Donahue show in 1981, William Atherton claimed that he was once homosexual but changed due to the Aesthetic Realism of Eli Siegel.

Atherton has sung in various productions in later years. In 2011, he performed "I Remember It Well," a popular song from Gigi with his former Reprise Theater co-star, Millicent Martin, at a sold-out performance in Palm Springs for Michael Childers' One Night Only, benefiting the Jewish Family Service of the Desert. He returned in 2013 to the same sold-out event to sing the classic, "Isn't It Romantic?" 

As an avid promoter of education, Atherton has worked with the Library Foundation of Los Angeles in readings benefiting the Los Angeles Public Library. He appeared twice with his former co-star, Stephanie Zimbalist in the Gregory Peck Reading Series and they were directed by the iconic Gregory Peck. One of these evenings was a tribute to actor Roddy McDowall who emceed their evening for the Library's benefactors.

In December 2018 Atherton participated in the Library Foundation's reading of excerpts from book editor and critic, David Kipen's best-seller, Dear Los Angeles: The City in Diaries and Letters, 1542 to 2018.

Atherton has also coached young adults in school programs, working directly with students in their class productions of Shakespearean plays and other well-known works.

Select filmography
FilmThe New Centurions (1972) – JohnsonClass of '44 (1973) – Fraternity PresidentThe Sugarland Express (1974) – Clovis Michael PoplinThe Day of the Locust (1975) – Tod HackettThe Hindenburg (1975) – Karl BoerthIndependence (1976) – Benjamin RushLooking for Mr. Goodbar (1977) – JamesGhostbusters (1984) – Walter PeckReal Genius (1985) – Professor Jerry HathawayNo Mercy (1986) – Allan DeveneuxDie Hard (1988) – Richard ThornburgDie Hard 2 (1990) – Richard ThornburgGrim Prairie Tales: Hit the Trail... to Terror (1990) – ArthurOscar (1991) – OvertonThe Pelican Brief (1993) – Bob GminskiSaints and Sinners (1994) – Terence McConeFrank & Jesse (1994) – Allan PinkertonBio-Dome (1996) – Dr. Noah FaulknerHoodlum (1997) – Thomas DeweyMad City (1997) – Malt DohlenMichael Kael vs. the World News Company (1998) – James DenitThe Stranger (1999) – ArthurThe Crow: Salvation (2000) – Nathan RandallBread and Roses (2000) – Himself – Party Guest (uncredited)Burning Down the House (2001) – Arthur KranstonNight Visions (2001) (TV series) – William PriceRace to Space (2001) – Ralph StantonThe Last Samurai (2003) – Winchester RepWho's Your Daddy? (2003) – Uncle Duncan 'Duncay' MackInto the Sun (2005) – Agent BlockHeadspace (2005) – Dr. Ira GoldKush (2007) – KingHacia la oscuridad (2007) – JohnTotally Baked (2007) – Mr. Lyle Funonion (Segment "FunOnion Boardroom")The Girl Next Door (2007) – Adult David MoranBlack Crescent Moon (2008) – Jo DextonThe Kane Files: Life of Trial (2010) – Daniel MorganTim and Eric's Billion Dollar Movie (2012) – Earle SwinterJersey Shore Shark Attack (2012) – DolanThe Citizen (2012) – WinstonGetting Back to Zero (2013)Jinn (2014) – Father WesthoffClinical (2017) – TerryLowlifes (2017)

Documentary filmCleanin' Up the Town: Remembering Ghostbusters (2019)

Video gamesGhostbusters: The Video Game  (2009)  (VG) – Walter Peck (Voice)Planet Coaster  (2019)  (VG) – Walter Peck (Voice)Ghostbusters: The Video Game Remastered  (2019)  (VG) – Walter Peck (Voice)

TelevisionCentennial (1978–1979) (TV miniseries) – Jim LloydThe House of Mirth (1981) (TV) – Lawrence SeldenMalibu (1983) (TV) – Stan HarveyThe Twilight Zone (1985, 1987) (TV series) – Mr. Dundee/Brian WolfeMurder, She Wrote (1985, 1987, 1991) (TV series) – Larry Holleran/Greg Dalton/Andy HenleyThe Equalizer (1987, 1989) (TV series) – Martin 'Alpha' Loeber/GideonBuried Alive (1990) (TV) – Cortland 'Cort' van OwenTales from the Crypt (1991) (TV series) – Malcolm MayflowerDiagnosis: Murder (1992) (TV) – Eric WalkerVirus (1995) (TV)Nash Bridges (1996) (TV series) – Dr. Linus MillsThe Practice (1997, 1999) (TV series) – D.A. Keith PrattThe Outer Limits (1998) (TV series) – Franklin MurdochIntroducing Dorothy Dandridge (1999) (TV) – Darryl ZanuckNight Visions (2001) (TV series) – William PriceLaw & Order (2002, 2004) (TV series) – Don Snyder/Dan JensenJustice League (2003) (TV series) – Dr. Destiny (voice only)Boston Legal (2005) (TV series) – A.D.A. Howard ZaleStargate SG-1 (2006) (TV series) – VartaDesperate Housewives (2006) (TV series) – Dr. BarrNumb3rs (2007) (TV series) – Warren PierceMonk (2008) (TV series) – Commander Nathan WhitakerLife (2008–2009) (TV series) – Mickey RaybornLost (Episode 607: "Dr. Linus")  (2010) (TV series) – Principal Donald ReynoldsLaw & Order: Special Victims Unit (2010) (TV series) – Ned BogdenCastle (Episode 61: "Head Case") (2011) (TV series) – Dr. Ari WeissWorkaholics (Episode 306: "The Meat Jerking Beef Boys") (2012) – Thor HolmvikDefiance'' (2013) – Viceroy Mercado

References

External links

 
 
 
 
 

1947 births
Living people
American male film actors
American male stage actors
American male television actors
Male actors from Connecticut
People from Orange, Connecticut
20th-century American male actors
21st-century American male actors
People self-identified as ex-gay
Carnegie Mellon University College of Fine Arts alumni